Camelon railway station is a railway station serving the suburb of Camelon in Falkirk, Scotland. It is located on the Edinburgh-Dunblane and Cumbernauld Lines. Train services are provided by ScotRail. The present station was opened in 1994.

History 
It was called Camelon from its opening until 1903 when it was called  Falkirk (Camelon) until its closure. The old station was a simple island platform with a ticket office and waiting room; access was from under the station via a set of stairs that led from a roadbridge.

The modern station has all the trappings of a 21st-century station, with both platforms accessible by wheelchair users, extensive use of CCTV and help points. There is free parking owned by the local authority adjacent to the south platform. This serves the nearby leisure facilities.

Services 
From Camelon, direct train services run to Glasgow (via ), Edinburgh and Dunblane, with a change required at Stirling for trains to Perth, Dundee, Aberdeen and Inverness, change at Glasgow or Edinburgh for trains to the south of Scotland and to England.

Trains on the Edinburgh – Dunblane route run every half hour and those to Cumbernauld and Glasgow run hourly.  There are no Glasgow trains on Sundays, whilst the Edinburgh to Dunblane route operates hourly each way.

References

Notes

Sources

External links
Video footage of Camelon Station

Railway stations in Falkirk (council area)
Railway stations in Great Britain opened in 1994
Railway stations served by ScotRail
Railway stations opened by Railtrack